Edward Fredrick "Ed" Etzel, Jr. (born September 6, 1952) is a sport shooter and Olympic champion for the United States. He won a gold medal in the 50 metre rifle prone event at the 1984 Summer Olympics in Los Angeles.

Etzel was born in North Haven, Connecticut . He competed for the U.S. Army team.  As of 2016, he is professor of Sport and Exercise Psychology at West Virginia University.

Etzel has been inducted into the USA Shooting Hall of fame.

References

External links

1952 births
Living people
Sportspeople from New Haven, Connecticut
American male sport shooters
ISSF rifle shooters
Olympic gold medalists for the United States in shooting
Shooters at the 1984 Summer Olympics
Olympic medalists in shooting
Medalists at the 1984 Summer Olympics
20th-century American people
21st-century American people